Čečejovce is a village and municipality in Košice-okolie District in the Košice Region of eastern Slovakia.

History
The village of Čečejovce is situated 205 m above sea level in the Košice Lowlands 22 km to the southwest of Košice in Slovakia. Čečejovce, including its part Seleška, has 2008 inhabitants.

The first written document of the village comes from the year 1317 where the settlement is named as "CECH". According to the tools made of stone 35 000 years B. C. and found in the territory of the village it can be made out, that the history of the village is much older and goes back as far as the Older Stone Age. The revealed foundations of ancient Neolithic settlements in various parts of the village's territory (the oldest comes from the period 5 000 years B. C.) prove the existence of numerous settlements with constructed dwellings already in the Stone Age when a considerable part of the territory was still covered by forests.

The Perényi's family was the first owner of the village known from the written document in 1402. Later, the Pédery and the Szirmay families are also named among the other possessors.

According to the records from 1427 the estimated number of inhabitants of the village was 350. Although the village itself wasn't occupied by Turks, it was almost completely unpopulated for fear of Turkish invasions. In 1715 there were only 4 families living here. After withdrawal of the Turks, the possessor of the village Szirmay let Hungarian families settle here. Afterwards, Slovak, Polish, and Ruthenian settlers also came to the area. In 1826 the village already had 1029 inhabitants, whose majority devoted themselves to agriculture.

In 1831 the surroundings of the village were affected with cholera, which took its victims also in this village. In 1869 there were counted 894 inhabitants here, in 1903 785, and in 1920 877 inhabitants. According to the census of Jews in 1848 there were 99 of them living in the village. A considerable part of population emigrated from the village to the US and Canada for work because of the difficult living conditions before and after World War I.

Čečejovce already had its seal in the 18th century (the oldest document with the seal comes from 1778) and its own post office in 1856. In 1885 a new building of post office with a telegraph and post office savings bank was built. The village gained in importance after establishing the notary's office in 1867-68 and the district registry office in 1895. Its significance raised still more by opening the railway line Košice-Turňa nad Bodvou in 1890. In the railway station Čečejovce 8 440 passengers got on trains in 1894.

Čečejovce formed part of the Austro-Hungarian Monarchy till its disintegration in 1918. In 1918 Čečejovce became part of Czechoslovakia. In 1938 the village was ceded to Hungary. From 1945 to 1992 it formed again part of Czechoslovakia. Since 1993 Čečejovce has been part of the Slovak Republic.

The oldest building of the village, which stands on its place even today, is a stone church from the age of the Árpáds built in Early Gothic style with the elements of Roman style.  The church, which was originally Roman Catholic, belongs to the Reformed Church since the time of Rákóczi's uprising in 1703. Probably the wall paintings from the 13th century inside the church were covered with plaster in that time. The valuable frescos were uncovered again in 1893. The frescos, which are national cultural relics, can be seen in their full splendour after finishing their last restoration in 1994.

The edifice of the Roman Catholic church, which was built in the Classical style in 1800, is the dominant building of Čečejovce. The church burnt down under till now unexplained circumstances in 1949 and has got its present form after its reconstruction and extension after the fire.  The tower of the church was also exchanged for a new one during the last renovation of the church in 1994–95.

A baroque manor house built in the middle of the 18th century stands close to the Catholic church. The facade of the manor house was remodeled in a neo-classical style at the beginning of the 19th century and is currently under reconstruction. Its main entrance gate from the 19th century has been preserved in its original form until now. 
Opposite the manor house there is a Memorial of World War I and II with the names of war victims from the village written on the stone column. The St. Stefan's Crown on the top of the memorial has its own history. The pyramid shape Millennia Monument, which has a message for the next generations inside, is just opposite.

The beginnings of education in Čečejovce are thought to be the years 1799–1801. However, school attendance has been compulsory only since 1868. Till 1907 education was provided at religious schools (Roman Catholic and Reformed). In 1907 both religious schools became state schools and were united into one school. The present-day primary school provides 9-years primary education for pupils from Čečejovce and its surroundings.

Seleška, which is part of Čečejovce, often changed its owners like Čečejovce. The settlement had formed an integral estate till selling off the lands in possession of Krajbich after World War I. The contemporary inhabitants of Seleška and their ancestors settled there in about 1920 from closer and wider surroundings, when they bought the parcelled out lands of Krajbich.

Geography
The village lies at an altitude of 205 metres and covers an area of 24.527 km2. The village is located 22 kilometres from Košice.

Ethnicity
According to the census in 2001, 60,5% of the inhabitants declared themselves as Slovak and 35,8% as Hungarian.

Government

The village has its own birth registry office but the police force, fire brigade and tax offices are located at Moldava nad Bodvou

Economy and facilities
The village also has developed medical facilities including a Pharmacy and outpatient facilities for children and adolescents.
The village also has a Slovakian insurance branch, and a post office.

Culture
The village has a public library and a DVD rental store, and a food store.

Sport
The village has a football pitch, and a gymnasium.

Transport
There is a railway station and a bus stop in the village.

Genealogical resources

The records for genealogical research are available at the state archive "Statny Archiv in Kosice, Slovakia"

 Roman Catholic church records (births/marriages/deaths): 1788-1897 (parish A)
 Greek Catholic church records (births/marriages/deaths): 1870-1902 (parish B)

See also
 List of municipalities and towns in Slovakia

External links
http://www.statistics.sk/mosmis/eng/run.html
Surnames of living people in Cecejovce

Villages and municipalities in Košice-okolie District
Hungarian communities in Slovakia